Astragalus trichopodus is a species of legume known by the common name Santa Barbara milk vetch. It is native to southern California and Baja California, where it grows in several types of open habitat, including in the Transverse Ranges and Mojave Desert.

Description
This is a robust perennial herb producing a branching stem up to about a meter in maximum height. The inflorescence is a raceme of up to 50 flowers which are cream colored and sometimes tinted with light purple.

The fruits hang in bunches where they develop from the inflorescence. Each pod contains many seeds.

References

External links
Jepson Manual Treatment
USDA Plants Profile
Photo gallery

trichopodus
Flora of Baja California
Flora of California
Flora of the California desert regions